Suzanne Louis-Lane (born 1965), is a female former badminton international who competed for England.

Badminton career
Louis-Lane represented England and won a gold medal in the mixed team event and reached the quarter finals of the women's singles, at the 1994 Commonwealth Games in Victoria, British Columbia, Canada.

She was twice the English National champion in 1993 and 1994 and won the 1989 Irish Open and the 1992 Welsh International.

Personal life
Her sons are Alex Lane and Ben Lane.

References

1967 births
English female badminton players
Commonwealth Games medallists in badminton
Commonwealth Games gold medallists for England
Badminton players at the 1994 Commonwealth Games
Living people
Medallists at the 1994 Commonwealth Games